In ring theory, a branch of mathematics, a semisimple algebra is an associative artinian algebra over a field which has trivial Jacobson radical (only the zero element of the algebra is in the Jacobson radical). If the algebra is finite-dimensional this is equivalent to saying that it can be expressed as a Cartesian product of simple subalgebras.

Definition
The Jacobson radical of an algebra over a field is the ideal consisting of all elements that annihilate every simple left-module. The radical contains all nilpotent ideals, and if the algebra is finite-dimensional, the radical itself is a nilpotent ideal.  A finite-dimensional algebra is then said to be semisimple if its radical contains only the zero element.

An algebra A is called simple if it has no proper ideals and A2 = {ab | a, b ∈ A}  ≠ {0}. As the terminology suggests, simple algebras are semisimple. The only possible ideals of a simple algebra A are A and {0}. Thus if A is simple, then A is not nilpotent. Because A2 is an ideal of A and A is simple, A2 = A. By induction, An = A for every positive integer n, i.e. A is not nilpotent.

Any self-adjoint subalgebra A of n × n matrices with complex entries is semisimple. Let Rad(A) be the radical of A. Suppose a matrix M is in Rad(A). Then M*M lies in some nilpotent ideals of A, therefore (M*M)k = 0 for some positive integer k. By positive-semidefiniteness of M*M, this implies M*M = 0. So M x is the zero vector for all x, i.e. M = 0.

If {Ai} is a finite collection of simple algebras, then their Cartesian product A=Π Ai is semisimple. If (ai) is an element of Rad(A) and e1 is the multiplicative identity in A1 (all simple algebras possess a multiplicative identity), then (a1, a2, ...) · (e1, 0, ...) = (a1, 0..., 0) lies in some nilpotent ideal of Π Ai. This implies, for all b in A1, a1b is nilpotent in A1, i.e. a1 ∈ Rad(A1). So a1 = 0. Similarly, ai = 0 for all other i.

It is less apparent from the definition that the converse of the above is also true, that is, any finite-dimensional semisimple algebra is isomorphic to a Cartesian product of a finite number of simple algebras.

Characterization
Let A be a finite-dimensional semisimple algebra, and

be a composition series of A, then A is isomorphic to the following Cartesian product:

where each

 
is a simple algebra.

The proof can be sketched as follows. First, invoking the assumption that A is semisimple, one can show that the J1 is a simple algebra (therefore unital). So J1 is a unital subalgebra and an ideal of J2. Therefore, one can decompose

By maximality of J1 as an ideal in J2 and also the semisimplicity of A, the algebra

is simple. Proceed by induction in similar fashion proves the claim. For example, J3 is the Cartesian product of simple algebras

The above result can be restated in a different way. For a semisimple algebra A = A1 ×...× An expressed in terms of its simple factors, consider the units ei ∈ Ai. The elements Ei = (0,...,ei,...,0) are idempotent elements in A and they lie in the center of A. Furthermore, Ei A = Ai, EiEj = 0 for i ≠ j,  and Σ Ei = 1, the multiplicative identity in A.

Therefore, for every semisimple algebra A, there exists idempotents {Ei} in the center of A, such that

EiEj = 0 for i ≠ j (such a set of idempotents is called central orthogonal), 
Σ Ei = 1, 
A is isomorphic to the Cartesian product of simple algebras E1 A ×...× En A.

Classification

A theorem due to Joseph Wedderburn completely classifies finite-dimensional semisimple algebras over a field . This product is unique up to permutation of the factors.

This theorem was later generalized by Emil Artin to semisimple rings. This more general result is called the Artin-Wedderburn theorem.

References

Springer Encyclopedia of Mathematics

Algebras